Gymkhana Grid is a gymkhana car race held annually in different venues around the world since 2010.

It was co-founded by racecar driver Ken Block, clothing brand DC Shoes and promoter Chris Willard. However, the 2011 edition was cancelled after business conflicts and Willard left the organization.

The racecourse is symmetrical, so drivers make a timed run on each one. The driver with best aggregate times advances to the next round of the bracket. Courses have tight corners, which encourage drivers to apply drifting techniques, and feature obstacles such as barrels, tyres, ship containers and tanks.

The event features several rallycross and drifting champions and also amateur racers, sometimes split in different classes. Likewise, each event had all-wheel drive and rear-wheel drive classes, except at the X Games Los Angeles 2013 where there was a single AWD class.

From 2013 to 2016, there were qualifier events held in different venues in Europe.

Winners

See also 
 Hoonigan Racing Division

References

External links 
 Official website

Auto races